The Tanzania Football Federation is the governing body mandated to run The sport of football in Tanzania. It oversees the national football team, Premier League,the Championship, First League,Regional Champions League,Youth U20 League and the Youth U15 League.
It is also in charge of Serengeti Lite Women's Premier League. Association football (soccer) is the most popular sport in Tanzania.

League System
The Tanzanian league football pyramid uses a promotion and relegation system. The champions of the nation's top level of football,  Tanzanian Premier League (Ligi Kuu Tanzania Bara) qualify to play in the following season's CAF Champions League. The bottom 3 teams are relegated to the Championship.

+30,000-capacity football stadiums in Tanzania

References

Further reading